The Catalonia Open is a darts tournament held in Calella, Catalonia. It has been held since 1995. The first edition was staged in Barcelona and then moved to Calella. This competition is organized by Federació Catalana de Dards (FCD) and is ranked for World Darts Federation (WDF) and British Darts Organisation (BDO). The official darts federation from Catalunya are a full member of World Darts Federation (WDF) from September 2011.

Originated by the successful participation of Catalonia Open, the organization was created FCD Anniversary Open coinciding with the twenty-fifth anniversary, and since 2015 this competition celebrates next day of the Catalonia Open on Sunday.

In 2020 the competition was canceled due to the Covid-19 pandemic.

List of winners

Men's singles

Women's singles

Tournament records
Mens:
 Most Wins 2:  Jez Porter
 Most Finals 3:  Colin Whiley
 Most Semi Finals 3:  Colin Whiley
 Most Quarter Finals 4:  Carles Arola

Ladies
 Most Wins 7:  Sharon Prins. 
 Most Finals 7:  Sharon Prins. 
 Most Semi Finals 2:  Aileen de Graaf

References

External links
Catalonia Darts Federation
Federació Catalana de Dards -Wikipedia CAT-

2012 establishments in Spain
Darts tournaments